Seodi Venekai-Rudo White is a social development lawyer and women's rights activist. , she is a legal consultant practicing as a Global Transactional Lawyer based in Malawi. She provides legal process outsourcing (LPO) services including contract drafting, contract management, legal support for management projects, support for business sale agreements, licensing sale agreements, data protection, data extraction, document review, legal analysis, and due diligence. She also provides legal management services in projects.

White obtained her law degree from the University of Botswana and is admitted to practice as an attorney in Botswana. She has a master's degree in Gender and Development from the University of Sussex in the United Kingdom. She is certified in Complete Modern Law Practice Curriculum provided by The Institute for the Future of Law Practice.

During her career, she has worked in private law practice, international development, women's rights activism and research, state owned enterprises (SOEs) reforms, public service management and public service reform.

She formed the Women and Law in Southern Africa Malawi Office (WLSA Malawi) in 1998 where she oversaw implementation of 19 research, training and advocacy programmes with results including reforms in national law, including the passing of the “Prevention of Domestic Violence Act 2006” which is a law in Malawi which protects of women in Malawi from the shackles of domestic violence and recognises their dignity and provides for security in the home. In addition, she also facilitated the passing of the “Deceased Estates (Inheritance, Succession and Protection) Act 2011” which is a law that criminalises the dispossession of widows upon the death of their husbands and therefore offers enhanced protection of women's rights particularly protection from poverty and hardship when their spouses die. White has also fought against violence against women, and child marriage. She has given a TED lecture on some of the strategies used to overcome gender bias and injustice.

From 2017 to 2021, she was Chief Director responsible for Public Sector Reforms in the Office of the President and Cabinet Malawi. She successfully led the public sector reforms programme in the government of Malawi and as well as in State Owned Corporations (SOEs). She coordinated the initiation of various reforms in Ministries, Agencies and Departments, and oversaw their implementation. She provided Technical and Strategic Leadership in the development of two key strategic and ground-breaking Policies namely, The Malawi National Public Sector Reforms Policy and the National Public Service Management Policy. These policies are aimed at revitalising the public service in Malawi so that it becomes a result oriented high performing civil service by 2022 that facilitates positive transformation of the economy and the Country's modernisation. In addition, she provided technical advice and leadership in the development and approval of Malawi's new Public Service Bill which had not been reviewed since its initial inception in 1994. This Bill aims to strengthen accountability, performance, and coordination in Malawi's Public Service.

In addition to the above, in the fall of 2007, she taught Graduate Studies at the University of Toronto as a Dame Nita Barrow Visiting Scholar where she gave a public lecture on Feminisation of HIV. She has also taught some courses at the International Law Institute (ILI) in Kampala Uganda in 2010 and 2011. She is also a guest lecturer at University of North Carolina, Department of African, African American, and Diaspora Studies and Curriculum in Global Studies where she has been teaching Change Management and Gender Justice since 2007 intermittently.

White has worked as an international development consultant in Liberia, South Sudan, Uganda, Tanzania, Zambia, Mozambique, Zimbabwe, and she has also worked with several international development institutions and her work covered a broader range of countries.

Publications

Books

Book chapters

Articles

Accolades
Malawi Human Rights Commission Award - 2004

References

21st-century Malawian lawyers
Malawian feminists
Malawian human rights activists
Living people
Malawian women lawyers
Year of birth missing (living people)
Alumni of the University of Sussex
Malawian women's rights activists